Hemed is a religious moshav in central Israel. Located near Or Yehuda, it falls under the jurisdiction of Sdot Dan Regional Council.

History
During the 18th and 19th centuries, the area belonged to the Nahiyeh (sub-district) of Lod that encompassed the area of the present-day city of Modi'in-Maccabim-Re'ut in the south to the present-day city of El'ad in the north, and from the foothills in the east, through the Lod Valley to the outskirts of Jaffa in the west. This area was home to thousands of inhabitants in about 20 villages, who had at their disposal tens of thousands of hectares of prime agricultural land.

The village was founded in 1950 by demobilised soldiers from the Israel Defense Forces who were immigrants from Czechoslovakia, Poland and Romania. Its name is an acronym for Hayilim Meshuhrarim Datiyim (lit. Demobilised Religious Soldiers). The residents initially worked in agriculture, but today much of the moshav's land is rented out for warehouses and industrial buildings.

References

External links
 

Moshavim
Religious Israeli communities
Populated places established in 1950
Populated places in Central District (Israel)
1950 establishments in Israel
Czech-Jewish culture in Israel
Polish-Jewish culture in Israel
Romanian-Jewish culture in Israel
Slovak-Jewish culture in Israel